Repercussion or Repercussions may refer to:

Books 

 Repercussions, a drumming book by John Macaluso

Film and TV 
 , a 2008 French TV film directed by Caroline Huppert
 "Repercussions", a 2003 episode of Alias
 "Repercussions", an 1989 episode of The Bill
 "Repercussions", a 2002 episode of Holby City

Music 
 Repercussion (singing), a technique in choral singing
 Repercussions (band), a sub band of Groove Collective 1995–1997

Albums 
 Re: Percussion, a 1973 album by ensemble M'Boom
 Repercussion (album), a 1982 album by The dB's
 Repercussions, a 2008 album by Distance

Songs 
 "Repercussions" (song), a 2010 song by Lauryn Hill Blueberry
 "Repercussion", a song by Danny Howells as Science Department
 "Repercussions", a song by A Certain Ratio
 "Repercussions", a 2002 song by rapper X-Raided from City of Kings
 "Repercussions", a song from Big Lurch discography
 "Repercussions", a song by NAV with Young Thug from the album Emergency Tsunami

See also 
 Percussion (disambiguation)